
 
 

Telowie is a locality in the Australian state of South Australia located about  north of the state capital of Adelaide and about  south-west of the municipal seat of Melrose.

It spans Telowie Gorge and the former Telowie Gorge Conservation Park (now part of Wapma Thura–Southern Flinders Ranges National Park).

The 2016 Australian census which was conducted in August 2016 reports that Telowie had a population of 95 people.

Telowie is located within the federal division of Grey, the state electoral district of Stuart and the local government area of the District Council of Mount Remarkable.

References

Towns in South Australia